Bob Bryan and Mike Bryan won the title, defeating Julien Benneteau and Michaël Llodra 7–5, 6–3 in the final.

Mahesh Bhupathi and Mark Knowles were the defending champions, but they chose to not compete together this year. Bhupathi played with Max Mirnyi and Knowles partnered with Radek Štěpánek.

Rafael Nadal and Novak Djokovic, ranked world No. 1 and No. 2 in singles, respectively, partnered for this event. It was first time that the singles world Nos. 1 and 2 had played together in a tour doubles match since Jimmy Connors and Arthur Ashe did so in 1976. They lost in the first round to the wildcard duo of Vasek Pospisil and Milos Raonic, ranked No. 329 and No. 217 in singles, respectively.

Seeds
The top eight seeds receive a bye into the second round.

Draw

Finals

Top half

Bottom half

References

Main Draw

Rogers Cup
Doubles